Laetilia amphimetra is a species of snout moth in the genus Laetilia. It was described by Edward Meyrick in 1939. It is found in Argentina.

References

Moths described in 1939
Phycitini